Colette Guyard (born 24 October 1952) is a French football player who played as defender for French club  Stade de Reims of the Division 1 Féminine.

International career

Guyard represented France in the first FIFA sanctioned women's international against the Netherlands on April 17, 1971.

References

1952 births
Stade de Reims Féminines players
French women's footballers
France women's international footballers
Division 1 Féminine players
Women's association football defenders
Living people